Echiodon is a genus of pearlfishes, with these currently recognized species:
 Echiodon anchipterus J. T. Williams, 1984 (closefin pearlfish)
 Echiodon atopus M. E. Anderson, 2005
 Echiodon coheni J. T. Williams, 1984
 Echiodon cryomargarites Markle, J. T. Williams & Olney, 1983 (messmate)
 Echiodon dawsoni J. T. Williams & Shipp, 1982 (Chain pearlfish)
 Echiodon dentatus (G. Cuvier, 1829)
 Echiodon drummondii W. Thompson, 1837
 Echiodon exsilium Rosenblatt, 1961 (nocturnal pearlfish)
 Echiodon neotes Markle & Olney, 1990
 Echiodon pegasus Markle & Olney, 1990
 Echiodon prionodon Parmentier, 2012
 Echiodon pukaki Markle & Olney, 1990
 Echiodon rendahli (Whitley, 1941) (Rendahl's messmate)

The name derives from Ancient Greek εχις (echis, "viper") and ὀδόν (odon, "tooth").

References

Carapidae